Trijntje "Trijnie" Rep (later Roozendaal; born 4 December 1950) is a Dutch former speed skater from who competed for the Netherlands at the  1972 Winter Olympics in the 500 and 1000 m and finished in 20th and 24th place, respectively. The following year she won a silver medal at the European and a bronze medal at the world allround championships.

Personal bests: 
500 m – 44.3 (1971)
 1000 m – 1:30.5 (1971)
 1500 m – 2:19.50 (1972)
 3000 m – 4:54.27 (1972)

After retiring from skating Rep competed in triathlon, in particular in the 2008 Ironman World Championship. She also ran the slaughterhouse Rep en Rozendaal in Barneveld, but went bankrupt in 2006 due to the impact of avian influenza.

References

1950 births
Living people
Dutch female speed skaters
Olympic speed skaters of the Netherlands
People from Oostzaan
Speed skaters at the 1972 Winter Olympics
World Allround Speed Skating Championships medalists
Sportspeople from North Holland
20th-century Dutch women
20th-century Dutch people
21st-century Dutch women